Aruna Biswas is a Bangladeshi television, stage and film actress. She is also a television drama director.

Background
Biswas is the daughter of jatra activists Amalendu Biswas and Jyotsna Biswas.

Career
Biswas debuted in film industry in 1986.

Biswas serves as the Charman of the production house Jatravision. As of 2019, Biswas acted in over 100 films. After 6 years staying in Canada, Biswas returned to Bangladesh. She directed her first TV serial Onnorokomer Lojja for Channel I. Then she completed Dolonchampa by Kazi Nazrul Islam, Boner Papiya and Dristhtidaan by Rabindranath Tagore, Shure Eka Chobi and Boro Didi by Sarat Chandra Chattopadhyay.

Biswas hosted television shows like "Food Caravan" on NTV and "Nachey Gaaney Number One" on Ekushey Television.

Filmography 
 Chapa Dangar Bou (1986)
 Parash Pathar (1986)
 Durnam (1989)
 Goriber Bou (1990)
 Danga Fasaad (1990)
 Mayer Dowa (1990)
 Koifeyot (1990)
 Ochena (1991)
 Nisshartha (1991)
 Lal Benarashi (1991)
 Khoma (1992)
 Gorom Hawa (1992)
 Mayer Kanna (1992)
 Mayer Ashirbad (1993)
 Obujh Sontan (1993)
 Prem Shakti (1993)
 Dushahosh (1994)
 Shashon (1995)
 Goriber Songshar (1996)
 Nishthur (1996)
 Premer Sriti (1996)
 Hangor Nodi Grenade as Nita (1997)
 Five Rifles (1997)
 Fashi (1997)
 Jollad (1998)
 Tyag (2004)
 Chachchu (2006)
 Dadima (2006)
 Kabin Nama (2007)
 Mon Jekhane Hridoy Sekhane (2009)
 Antaranga (2015)
 Dulabhai Zindabad (2017)
 Bhalo Theko (2018)
Ratrir Jatri (2019)
 Mayaboti (2019)
 Shaan (2022)
 Antaratma (upcoming)

References

External links

Living people
Bengali Hindus
Bangladeshi Hindus
Bangladeshi television actresses
Bangladeshi film actresses
Bangladeshi stage actresses
Bangladeshi television directors
Women television directors
1967 births